Briseis was a princess in Greek mythology.

Briseis may also refer to: 
Briséïs, 1897 opera by Emmanuel Chabrier
Briseis (British horse) (1804–1824), British racehorse
Briseis (Australian horse) (1873–1879), Australian racehorse
HMS Briseis, ships of the Royal Navy
655 Briseïs, minor planet orbiting the Sun
 Briseis Mine and Dam in Derby, Tasmania